The Brothers Znamensky Memorial is an annual track and field competition which is held at the Meteor Stadium in Zhukovsky, Russia.

The event is held in memory of Seraphim and Georgy Znamensky, the 1930s Soviet champions in long-distance running who died in 1942 and 1946, respectively. It was established in 1949, and received an international status in 1958, as only Soviet (Russian) athletes competed in 1949–1950 and 1998, and there was a break in the event between 1950 and 1958. 

Each edition features memorial races over distances from 1500 metres to 10,000 metres. The event has attracted many high-profile runners throughout the decades, from Gaston Roelants and Pyotr Bolotnikov to Kip Keino and Evgeni Ignatov, through to Noureddine Morceli and Daniel Komen. The memorial is a highly international competition: athletes from over 50 countries have reached the podium at the Brothers Znamensky meet. The meeting typically features ten events for national level competitors and sixteen events with international fields.

The meeting has held an IAAF status from 2000 onwards. Initially it was part of the IAAF Grand Prix circuit, then became part of the IAAF World Athletics Tour and the IAAF World Challenge Meetings until 2011 when it was replaced by the Moscow Challenge. Currently it is one of the European Athletics Outdoor Classic Meetings. The competition was previously held at various locations in Russia, but following the completion of the Meteor Stadium the event became an annual fixture in Zhukovsky. The current meeting director is Mikhail Butov.

Meeting records

Men

Women

References

External links

Official website at Russian Athletics
Brothers Znamensky Memorial Records

Annual track and field meetings
IAAF World Challenge
IAAF Grand Prix
Recurring sporting events established in 1949
Athletics competitions in Russia
Sport in Moscow Oblast
Athletics competitions in the Soviet Union
IAAF World Outdoor Meetings